The Ayrshire Cup was an annual association football regional competition in Scotland. The cup competition was a knockout tournament between football clubs in the historic county of Ayrshire. The Ayrshire Cup was first held in 1877–78, the trophy being a solid silver vase, 30 inches high, and valued at £100, designed by Messrs John Cameron & Son.  The first winners were Mauchline.

The competition was most recently held in the 1997–98 season, when it was won by Kilmarnock. Although the Cup has not been competed for since, discussions have taken place between all the major participating clubs (Ayr United, Girvan and Kilmarnock) who have stated that they would welcome the return of the Ayrshire Cup.

Format

History

The first time the Ayrshire Cup was competed for was in 1877–78,  with the first winners being Mauchline.
26 clubs entered the first year of the competition, consisting of Catrine, Largs Western, Beith Thistle, Dalry Rangers, Kilmarnock, Kilbirnie, Ayr Academicals, Kilmarnock Cricket and Football Club, Kilmarnock Portland, Kilmarnock Dean, Kilmarnock Hawthorn, Kilmaur Floors, Irvine, Mauchline, Burnfoothill Ramblers, Maybole Carrick, Tarbolton, Beith, Maybole Ladywell, Cumnock, Rankinston Mountaineers, Lanemark, Stewarton, Kilmarnock Star, Vale of Irvine, Girvan, and Hurlford.

The number of entrants for the cup peaked prior to World War II at over 40, however by 1946 Ayr United and Kilmarnock were the only entrants. In 1978–79 Girvan Amateurs joined the competition, however the last winner outside the 'big two' (being Ayr United and Kilmarnock) was Beith in 1926–27.

Penalty shoot-outs were introduced in 1970–71.

Performance by club

Ayrshire Cup Finals

Key

Finals

Notes

Ayrshire Cups in other categories
Ayrshire Cups continue to operate at Junior level – the region's clubs have a strong presence nationally, winning the Scottish Junior Cup on multiple occasions – and in the local amateur league.

The Ayrshire Cup was last run in the 2017-18 season, with Kilwinning Rangers winning the last edition after defeating Largs Thistle.

See also
 Ayrshire derby

References

Football cup competitions in Scotland
1877 establishments in Scotland
Football in South Ayrshire
Recurring sporting events established in 1877
Ayr United F.C.
Kilmarnock F.C.
Defunct football cup competitions in Scotland
Football in East Ayrshire